Rent-A-Pal is a 2020 American thriller film written and directed by Jon Stevenson, produced by J.D. Lifshitz, Brian Landis Folkins, Jon Stevenson, Annie Elizabeth Baker, Jimmy Weber, Robert B. Martin Jr., Brandon Fryman and Raphael Margules. It stars Wil Wheaton, Brian Landis Folkins, Kathleen Brady, Amy Rutledge, and Adrian Egolf.

Rent-A-Pal was released on September 11, 2020, by IFC Midnight, and received positive reviews from critics.

Plot

David Brower is a middle-aged bachelor in 1990 who is looking for a romantic partner while also caring for his irritable dementia-ridden mother Lucille. His father, Frank, an accomplished jazz musician, committed suicide ten years prior. He has been utilizing Video Rendezvous, a video dating service, for six months to no avail. After going to one of their locations to record an updated tape, David stumbles across another tape in their bargain bin titled "Rent-A-Pal," which he purchases after it intrigues him. Watching the tape, he finds that Rent-A-Pal features its host, Andy, who talks to the viewer and leaves in pauses to allow the viewer to simulate a conversation, though is quickly disillusioned and shuts it off.

The next morning, David is contacted by Video Rendezvous, who says that a woman, Lisa, wanted to match with him after watching his latest tape. When he goes to retrieve her tape, the receptionist informs him that she has already found another match, and when he watches her tape, he learns that she likes jazz and is a professional caregiver, depressing him further. He decides to continue watching Rent-A-Pal, where David confides in Andy that Lucille, like Andy's mother, was physically abusive. David also talks about his failures to find a partner, and when Andy shares a story about a girl who lied to avoid going to a dance with him in high school, he convinces David to make him his friend.

David continuously watches the tape, virtually talking, drinking, and playing cards with Andy. During one viewing, Andy presses David for an embarrassing story, in which David talks about how bullies in middle school left sexually explicit and threatening notes in David's name in the locker of a girl he liked which resulted in his suspension, the ordeal giving David trust issues. Andy begins to share an embarrassing story of his own from his college days, which begins to get increasingly more detailed and sexually charged as he goes on, prompting David to begin masturbating to it, even as Andy inexplicably begins using David's name instead of his own as he recounts the story. Lucille catches David in the act, but mistakes him for her late husband. As she gets more belligerent, David, in his anger, tells her that her husband is dead. After this causes her to break down, he recants and says that Frank is still alive and well to calm her down.

One day, David receives another call from Video Rendezvous, who informs him that Lisa's previous match didn't work out and that she's once again interested in him. The two go on a date at a roller rink/arcade, where the two talk and connect about their experience in caregiving. The date goes successfully, and Lisa gives David her number and sets up another date for the following evening. David tells Andy about it, but Andy is strangely angered by this, accusing David of casting him aside and forgetting about a previously planned time to play cards, causing David to cancel his date the following morning, using his mom as an excuse.

David spends the evening interacting with Andy, and when he goes upstairs for a drink, he discovers that Lucille has wandered out of the home. Frantic and unable to find her, David considers calling 911, but calls Lisa for help, and with her assistance, he locates her and returns her home. David takes the opportunity to show her his room and share his father's music with her. They begin to get intimate on the couch, during which David sits on the remote and turns Rent-A-Pal on. As Andy seems to judgingly watch David make out with Lisa, David prematurely ejaculates when Lisa touches his leg and Andy laughs hysterically, alerting Lisa. When Lisa questions David about the tape, he gets angry and defensive, prompting her to leave.

The next morning, as David cleans the house, he finds a picture in his mother's room featuring him and Andy, seemingly taken during the course of the tape. He then finds his Rent-A-Pal tape missing, only to discover Lucille cutting the tape's film in the kitchen, mistaking it for Scotch tape. Furious, David strikes Lucille across the face with the tape, knocking her to the ground, before going to Video Rendezvous and aggressively acquiring another Rent-A-Pal tape. After re-watching it, he takes Lucille, still on the kitchen floor, to the top of the basement stairwell. After she addresses him as David, he coldly whispers to her that she's the reason that Frank killed himself before pushing her down, grievously injuring her. Soon, all the TVs in the house begin to play Rent-A-Pal as Andy expresses his excitement to be David's friend.

Lisa arrives at David's house, wanting to make amends for the previous night and bring over dinner, but she discovers Lucille's body. David confronts her, speaking like Andy as he attempts to keep her from calling the police before trying to murder her. Lisa manages to free herself and stabs David in the chest with a pair of scissors before fleeing and shouting for help. David drags himself into the basement and fast-forwards the Rent-A-Pal tape to the end in which Andy forlornly says goodbye to the viewer before he bleeds out.

Cast
 Wil Wheaton as Andy
 Brian Landis Folkins as David Brower
 Amy Rutledge as Lisa
 Kathleen Brady as Lucille Brower
 Adrian Egolf as Diane
 Josh Staan as Camera man
 Luke Sorge as Customer
 Olivia Hendrick as Susan
 Andrew Vincent as Rollerskater
 Karin Carr as Carla
 Sara Woodyard as Mary
 Brandon Fryman as Skate City employee

Release
The film was released on September 11, 2020.

Reception
The website's critics consensus reads: "Rent-A-Pal suffers from untapped thematic potential, but Wil Wheaton's unsettling performance makes this unique horror story worth watching." On Metacritic, the film has a weighted average score of 61 out of 100, based on 7 critics, indicating "Generally Favorable reviews".

Frank Scheck of The Hollywood Reporter wrote: "What makes the film work as well as it does, at least up to a point, are the perfectly calibrated performances."

References

External links
 
 

2020 films
2020 thriller films
American thriller films
Matricide in fiction
Films shot in Colorado
Films set in Colorado
2020s English-language films
2020s American films
Films impacted by the COVID-19 pandemic